St. Benedict's Preparatory School is a Catholic college preparatory school in Newark, New Jersey run by the Benedictines. 

The school serves boys and girls in kindergarten through twelfth grade on a  urban campus. The school has been accredited by the Middle States Association of Colleges and Schools Commission on Elementary and Secondary Schools since 1990.

History
Established in 1868 by the Benedictine monks of Newark Abbey, the school is guided by the sixth century Rule of Saint Benedict. It has been a located in the Archdiocese of Newark for more than 130 years.

As of the 2017–18 school year, the school had an enrollment of 749 students and 48.5 classroom teachers (on an FTE basis), for a student–teacher ratio of 15.4:1. The school's student body was 55.1% (413) Black, 29.8% (223) Hispanic, 7.1% (53) two or more races, 6.4% (48) White and 1.5% (11) Asian. The school serves students from Newark and its neighboring communities; students come from 100 towns and approximately 215 schools. More than 60 are from 23 other countries.

Starting in the 2017–18 school year, the former St. Mary School began operating within St. Benedict's. Classes for kindergarten through sixth grade are co-ed and grades 7 and 8 are segregated by gender, while the high school program remains all boys.

The school was closed for the 1972–73 school year. Since its re-opening in 1973, the headmaster has been Fr. Edwin D. Leahy, O.S.B, who was graduated from St. Benedict's in 1963.

High school academic year and leadership
St. Benedict's school year differs from most high schools. The school year is divided into three "phases"; Summer phase, Fall-Winter phase, and Spring phase. During Summer phase the whole student body of St. Benedict's gathers for a five-week session of half-day classes during August. For the members of the Freshman class, the session begins with the five-day overnight. The Freshman class is divided into 18 groups of approximately eight students each, with an older student acting as counselor for the week, preferably a sophomore or junior student. Meals are taken "family style" in the dining room, as students taking turns being the waiters for their designated group, setting the table, serving the food, and clearing up afterward. Freshmen meet faculty members and older students, discover Benedict's history and traditions and learn the school songs. At the end of the week the students will be quizzed verbally on the school's history by current faculty, leaders, and alumni. The numbers of questions depends solely on who the person is, and passing will result in the students earning their colors (Garnet & Gray).

During the fall-winter phase students have regular school days with classes beginning at 7:50 and daily convocation in the Shanley Gym at 7:50 on Monday, Tuesday, Wednesday, Thursday, and Friday. Wednesday is an early dismissal at 2:15pm. On Thursday, school begins with convocation at 7:50 followed by Mass (Catholic church service) for one of the four sections of the school. The sections alternate turns going to Mass each week, attending Mass approximately once a month. During convocation, prayers are said and songs are sung with the whole community present. At the end of convocation there is a brief time period during which the entire community takes part in sharing announcements with the rest of the school body. These announcements are about upcoming events, results from past events, meetings for leadership, opportunities for extra help, and things that the community is either doing well with or needs to improve on.

Spring phase ends the academic year. Students choose projects to work on for four weeks such as community service, U.S. history, gardening, dancing, music production, photography, journalism, finance, acting, physics, intense exercising, karate, and cooking.

At the end of the Freshmen year, freshmen spend a week together. They sleep in tents and team members take turns cooking for one another, preparing food they have carried on their backs. Freshmen form themselves into 16 teams of eight members each and elect a leader. Upon selecting a leader, they also make decisions for the rest of available positions, which are the camping specialists (2), the cooks (2), the first aid person (1), the nature specialist (1), the navigator (1), and the captain. Four such teams make a "company" that is led by specially trained older students, first-aiders, and adults. Three weeks of intense training precede the week on the trail. Bringing back old history, transfer students no longer have choice as they too have to walk the trail.

St. Benedict's is divided into 18 groups of about 20 to 30 members each. Each group, named after successful Benedict's alumnus, meets daily, competes in events, academics, attendance, and plays an active role in running the school. Each group elects a student Group Leader and Assistant Leaders and works closely with its faculty advisers. The school is run by group of eight distinctive seniors. The Senior Group leader, four section leaders, a freshman leader, a transfer leader, and a seventh and eighth grade leader. They work together daily in leading the school and enforcing rules.

Athletics
The St. Benedict's Preparatory School Gray Bees, compete in 12 interscholastic sports: water polo, cross country running, soccer, swimming, fencing, wrestling, basketball, indoor track, crew, golf, baseball, and outdoor track. The school has produced several notable athletes including an Olympic gold medalist. School colors are garnet and gray.

The cross country running team won the all-group state championship in 1921 and the Prep title in nine times from 1922 to 1931. The program's nine state group titles are tied for sixth-most in the state.

The track team won the indoor track Non-Public state championship in six times from 1922 to 1927 and seven times from 1931 to 1937. The 13 state group titles won by the program are ranked fourth in the state.

The track team won the Non-Public Group A spring track state championship in 1949.

The wrestling team won the Non-Public Group B North state sectional championship in 1980 (as co-champion), 1984, 1985, 1987, and 1989 to 1991. The team won the Non-public Group B state title in 1987 and 1989 to 1991.

The fencing team won the overall state championship in 1990.

St. Benedict's basketball team, coached by Mark Taylor since 2011, consistently ranks as one of the top high-school basketball teams in the United States among USA Today High School Boys' Basketball Super 25. and is part of what The New York Times calls the "NBA pipeline". In 2013, the basketball team was ranked fifth in ESPN's top 25, losing to Montverde Academy in the ESPN Rise National Championship.

The soccer team won the Non-Public Group B state championship in 1982 (against runner-up Mater Dei High School in the finals of the tournament), 1987 (vs. Mater Dei), 1989 (vs. Eustace Preparatory School) and 1990 (vs. St. Augustine Preparatory School). The 1982 team finished the season with an 18-3-1 record after coming back from a 2–0 deficit to win the Parochial B state title with a 3–2 win against Mater Dei in the championship game at Mercer County Park. The 2006 boys' soccer team finished the season with a 20–0 record, and was ranked first in the nation in the NSCAA/adidas National Rankings. A 4–1 win against the Pennington School in the 2011 Prep A championship gave St. Benedict's a perfect 24–0 season, its 23rd consecutive Prep A title and its seventh spot as the top-ranked high school soccer team in the nation by ESPN/Rise, having previously been recognized as national champion in 1990, 1997–98, 2001, 2005–06 and repeating in 2011–2012 and 2012–2013. Numerous alumni of the soccer program have become world-renowned players.

Extracurricular activities
St. Benedict's has a music program and a visual arts program.

The Benedict News student newspaper has won the Columbia Scholastic Press Association gold medal three times, in 2005, 2006, and again in 2008. The school literary magazine, The Kayrix, is published every year during spring phase.

The 520 is a student-run maintenance corporation. The goal of the corporation is to cost-effectively support the maintenance needs of the school while enhancing the environment and providing students with the opportunity to develop skills and earn a competitive income. The corporation was established in 1998.

Publicity
The history of the school is related in Thomas A. McCabe's Miracle on High Street (New York: Fordham University Press, 2010). On March 20, 2016, the school was featured in a segment of 60 Minutes called "The Resurrection of St. Benedict's".

Documentary
The critically acclaimed documentary about Newark Abbey and Saint Benedict's Prep, The Rule (2014), by Emmy-nominated, Newark-based filmmakers Marylou and Jerome Bongiorno, was released theatrically, broadcast nationally on PBS, and was screened by the White House Initiative on Educational Excellence for African Americans at the U.S. Department of Education. The film premiered at the 2014 Montclair Film Festival.

Notable affiliates

Alumni

 Precious Achiuwa (born 1999), professional basketball player for the Toronto Raptors of the National Basketball Association.
 Hugh Joseph Addonizio (1914-1981), politician who served for 13 years as a U.S. Congressman before serving as Mayor of Newark from 1962 to 1970.
 Juan Agudelo (born 1992), professional soccer player in Major League Soccer.
 Gregg Berhalter (born 1973), professional soccer player and coach, member of 2002 and 2006 FIFA World Cup teams, coach of the United States men's ntional soccer team.
 Gilvydas Biruta (born 1991), Lithuanian basketball player for JL Bourg-en-Bresse of the Pro A.
 Isaiah Briscoe (born 1996), basketball player for the Kentucky Wildcats men's basketball team who transferred out after his sophomore year.
 A. J. Calloway (born 1974), television personality
 Jonathan Capehart (born 1967), journalist and television personality who writes the PostPartisan blog for The Washington Post.
 Peter A. Carlesimo (1915–2003), basketball coach.
 Ownie Carroll (1902–1975), Major League Baseball pitcher who played nine seasons in the majors, from 1925 to 1934.
 Edward Cheserek (born 1994), runner for the University of Oregon who won the 2013 NCAA cross country championship and track and field championship.
 Moussa Cissé (born 2002), college basketball player for the Oklahoma State Cowboys
 Bill Clarkin (1900–1982), professional football in the National Football League who played as a tackle and guard for the Orange Tornadoes.
 George Thomas Coker (born 1943), United States Navy aviator who was a prisoner of war during the Vietnam War.
 David Cubillán (born 1987), basketball player for the Marquette Golden Eagles
 John J. Degnan (born 1944), Attorney General of New Jersey, 1978–1981, vice chairman and chief operating officer of The Chubb Corporation.
 James Delany (born 1948), commissioner of the Big Ten Conference.
 Joe Dooley (born 1966), head basketball coach at East Carolina Pirates men's basketball team.
 Trevon Duval (born 1998), basketball player for the Duke Blue Devils men's basketball team.
 Gregory Echenique (born 1990), professional basketball player for the Shimane Susanoo Magic of the B.League.
 Bobby Edwards (born 1995), soccer goalkeeper.
 Tyler Ennis (born 1994), basketball player for the Los Angeles Lakers.
 Aaron Estrada (born 2001), standout college basketball player who was the 2022 Colonial Athletic Association Player of the Year
 Gabriel Ferrari (born 1988), professional soccer striker.
 Allen Gavilanes (born 1999), soccer player who plays for Greenville Triumph SC in USL League One.
 John Joseph Gibbons (born 1924), federal judge on the United States Court of Appeals for the Third Circuit, president of the New Jersey State Bar Association and partner at the Gibbons P.C. law firm.
 George Ludlum Hartford (1864–1957), longtime Chairman and Treasurer of the Great Atlantic and Pacific Tea Company who started working in the supermarket chain while still a student.
 Cullen Jones (born 1984), Gold Medalist at the 2008 Summer Olympics in Beijing in the Men's 4 × 100 m Freestyle Relay.
 G. Gordon Liddy (1930–2021), central figure in the Watergate scandal, mastermind of the break into Democratic National Committee headquarters in the Watergate building in 1972.
 Scott Machado (born 1990), basketball player who plays for Hapoel Eilat of the Israeli Basketball Premier League.
 Philip McHarris (born 1992), civil rights activist, political writer and academic at Yale University.
 Andris Misters (born 1992), Latvian professional basketball player for VEF Rīga of the Latvian Basketball League.
 Mpho Moloi (born 1983), drafted by the Houston Dynamo of Major League Soccer in 2006 and won the MLS Championship with them.
 Xavier Munford (born 1992), basketball player for Hapoel Tel Aviv of the Israeli Basketball Premier League.
 Kevin O'Connor (born 1968; class of 1986), host of This Old House.
 Mike Olla (born 1994), professional soccer forward.
 Robert DeShaun Peace (born 1980), subject of the biography The Short and Tragic Life of Robert Peace.
 Tab Ramos (born 1966), former professional soccer midfielder who has been inducted into the National Soccer Hall of Fame.
 Claudio Reyna (born 1973), soccer midfielder; two-time Parade Magazine High School Player of the Year; three-time First Team All American at University of Virginia; College Player of the Century; played for Manchester City in England, Rangers F.C. in Scotland and Major League Soccer's New York Red Bulls; member of 1992 and 1996 Summer Olympics, 1998, 2002 and 2006 FIFA World Cup teams; National Soccer Hall of Fame
 Frank E. Rodgers (1909–2000), politician who served for 48 years as Mayor of Harrison, New Jersey, ranking him among the longest-serving Mayors in U.S. history.
 Zack Rosen (born 1989), All-American basketball player at Penn who plays for Maccabi Ashdod in Israel.
 Noah Sadaoui (born 1993, class of 2011), Moroccan-American professional soccer player who currently plays as a winger with Al-Khaburah Club.
 Samardo Samuels (born 1989), power forward/center who played for the Cleveland Cavaliers and currently plays for Olimpia Milano.
 Chris Smith (born 1987), basketball player for Hapoel Galil Elyon of the Israeli Liga Leumit
 J. R. Smith (born 1985), former professional basketball player and two-time NBA champion.
 John M. Smith (born 1935), prelate of the Roman Catholic Church, who served as the ninth Bishop of Trenton, from 1997 to 2010.
 Corey Stokes (born 1988), Villanova shooting guard who was selected to compete in the McDonald's All-American Game.
 Walt Szot (1920–1981), football tackle who played five seasons in the NFL with the Chicago Cardinals and Pittsburgh Steelers.
 Lance Thomas (born 1988), former Duke basketball player and member of the 2010 NCAA Championship team and currently plays for the New York Knicks.
 Petter Villegas (born 1975), soccer winger, who played in Major League Soccer and for the Puerto Rico national football team.
 Dick Weisgerber (1915-1984), defensive back, fullback and kicker who played four NFL seasons with the Green Bay Packers.
 John J. Wilson (1926-2015), politician who served in the New Jersey General Assembly from 1958 to 1964.
 Michael Young (born 1994), basketball player for Ironi Nahariya of the Israeli Basketball Premier League.

Faculty
 Ernest Blood (1872–1955), basketball coach who led St. Benedict's Prep to a 421–128 record and five state championships from 1925 to 1950.
 Dan Hurley (2001–2010), basketball coach and former player and member of famed Hurley family, who led the Gray Bees to a  223-21 overall record while head coach and became the fastest coach in New Jersey basketball history to reach the 200-win mark.

References

External links
School Website
Data for St. Benedict's Preparatory School, National Center for Education Statistics

1868 establishments in New Jersey
Benedictine secondary schools
Boarding schools in New Jersey
Boys' schools in New Jersey
Educational institutions established in 1868
Middle States Commission on Secondary Schools
Private high schools in Essex County, New Jersey
Private K-12 schools in New Jersey
Roman Catholic Archdiocese of Newark
Catholic secondary schools in New Jersey
Catholic boarding schools in the United States
High schools in Newark, New Jersey